Efik names are names borne by the Efik people of Southern Nigeria and Western Cameroon. The naming system of the Efik is unique and differs from contemporary African names in several ways.

Like many cultures, The naming of an Efik child takes place at a naming ceremony. Unlike many Nigeria names, most Efik names do not possess literal meanings but store information about a child. Such information may include the circumstances of the child's birth, the day or time the child was born and the family the child comes from. The lack of literal meaning in many Efik names is because the practice of assigning literal sentences as names to children was rare. In modern times, The most common practice among the Efik is to assign a child the name of an ancestor or a parent. Every Efik child has at least four different names which include birth names (enyiñ emana), given names (ata enyiñ/usio enyiñ), nicknames (udori enyiñ or nditik enyiñ) and honorific or pet names (enyiñ uko or enyiñ akparawa). So important was the act of naming a child that every individual in the average Efik family or house was expected to be able to recite their seven ancestral names in an exercise known as Utịñ emana,.

Birth name
Originally, birth names were used alongside real names but over the centuries, birth names have also been used as real names. Birth names can depict the day an individual was born. The Efik originally had an 8-day week system. Among the days of the Efik week include, Akwa Ikwọ, Akwa Ederi, Akwa Ibibio, Akwa Ọfiọñ, Ekpri Ikwọ, Ekpri Ederi, Ekpri Ibibio and Ekpri Ọfiọñ.

Week-day names are also common in other West African ethnic groups such as the Akan, Hausa, Igbo and several others. Children may also be assigned names according to the time of the day of which they were born. For example, a male child born at night is named Okon and a female child born at night is named Nko or Nkoyo. Mensah attests that sometimes the name Okonanwan is assigned to a child born as Night. Birth names were used to recall the period that events occurred in a family. Birth-names can also depict the position of a child in a family. However, names which depict the position of a child are never regarded as real names or used in formal settings among the Efik. These formal settings include school enrollment or any other public records. These names are also never expected to be mentioned when the exercise known as Utịñ Emana was carried out. Among these names include:

Real name
Real names in Efik are known as Ata enyịñ or Usio enyịñ. These names are often ancestral names and can be used to identify true Efik indigenes. Although the most popular custom is to assign a child the name of a person in his family tree, real names were originally influenced by factors such as the natural environment and traditional religion.

Names influenced by Natural Environment
The Efik people were primarily fishermen and as such, their daily activities mainly revolved around water bodies. Waterbodies such as rivers, streams, seas etc was sometimes instrumental in the naming of a child. Among such names included Inyañ, Idim, Esuk and Eme.

Names influenced by Efik Trado-Religion and beliefs

The Efik traditional religion and beliefs are also factors which play a role in the Efik naming system. Names of deities were assigned to children for numerous reasons. Among these deities included Abasi, Ekpenyong, Ekanem, Anansa, Anantigha and several others. It was believed that these deities watched over those who bore these names and ensured no harm came to them. The name Ndem which translates of Marine deities was originally assigned to children who were born via the intercession of the parents to the Ndem. Names such as Nyoñ reflect the belief in reincarnation among the Efik. Originally, A mother whose child dies names her next child Nyoñ as it is believed the new child is a reincarnation of the former.
Several factors were influential in the assigning of names of animals to Children. One of such factors is the belief in Ukpọñ Ikọt. Although it is very easy to assume the child's name possesses a simple literal interpretation, qualities admired in certain animals was one of the reasons the name of the animal was assigned to the child. For example, the Efik cow is considered a sacred animal among the Efik and symbolises purity. This specie of cows known as the friesian pygmy cows are very rare and are rarely milked their cows or eaten. Children were sometimes named after great creatures such as Ekpe (Lion), Anwa (Cat), Omon (Gorilla), Eso (Water chevrotain), Enang (Cow) and Usari (Kingfisher).

Children were also assigned the names of heavenly bodies. Among these heavenly bodies include Orok Abasi (Moon ring), Eyo (Sun rays), Anwa Obo (Jupiter), Offiong (Moon), Ntan-nta ọffiọñ (Stars).

Philosophy
The average Nigerian indigenous name is a combination of words of gratitude, reverence, praise and belief in a supreme being or a traditional deity. The name of the supreme being in many Nigerian Languages would include Oluwa, Olisa, Aondoo, Chukwu, Osa/Osanobua etc The outcome of the different names of God in the various ethnicities together with a string of words give rise to names such as: Adeosun - Crown of Osun; Anuoluwapo - God mercies are abundant; Tamarapreye - God's gift; Osayoghoghówemwén - God has endowed me with joy; Kamdilichukwu - Let me live for God; Onyedikachukwu - Who is like God etc. In some cases, the average Nigerian name may reference other deities such as Osimiri, Ala, Kamalu etc. Despite the pantheon of deities found in the traditional religion of various Nigerian ethnicities, they do not assign the names of deities to children. One rarely hears a Nigerian of non-Efik descent bear names such as Olokun, Ogun, Osun, Ala, Ikenga, Amadioha, Oto, Egbesu etc. In the case of the Efik, several names infer a personal relationship with the supreme being or deities and skip the protocol found in the average Nigerian name. The Efik who worship Abasi and in former times, a pantheon of deities such as Ekpenyọñ, Ekanem, Obo Iwomen, Anansa, Ewa Okon, Eka Asari, have never had a problem assigning the names of deities to children. An Efik child bears Abasi, the name of the supreme being. Efik children also bear names of deities or sacred objects of reverence e.g Ekpenyọñ, Ekanem, Inyañ, Adịm, Ndem, Ibitam and Inima. This has been the case for centuries. Among the Efik of Iboku, the early ancestors bore names with spiritual symbolism i.e Oku (Priest), Ukpong (Soul), Adim (derived from Ibiadịm, the Ndem wand).

Names influenced via kinship and blood ties
Names can also be introduced into a family via marriage. Parents may wish to assign the name of the child's maternal grandmother who may be non-Efik to the child. Such intermarriages have given rise to several new names in a family tree. A notable example is the Efik name Umo which is common among the people of Duke town. The name Umo was introduced among the Duke town families through the union between Ekpo Efiom Okoho and Umo Efembe Umo Eren (An Uruan princess). Originally, the name Umo was given to children born when a family relative is undergoing their coming of age ceremony (Inam).

Names recognising notable figures
It was not uncommon for children to be named after notable Efik figures. Some of these notable figures include Eyoma (derived from Eyọ Ema - the Edidem of the Efik), Edem-Ekpenyong - the 5th Iyamba of Ekpe Efik Iboku, Esien Ekpe - the first Iyamba of Ekpe Efik Iboku, Eneyọ (derived from Ene Eyọ - a son of Eyọ Ema Atai) and Efiom Okoho - One of the patriarchs of Duke town. The latter was the name of King Archibong I, a direct descendant of Efiom Okoho.

Honorific names
These names are regarded as a mark of respect and sometimes describe the status of the bearer in society. Examples of such names include:
 Owot uko - Full version: Owot uko atua usen nnanenyin.
 Ọkpọ ọsọñ - Full version:Ọkpọ ọsọñ akan ukwak.
 Eto nkukim - Full version: Eto nkukim inuen isọrọke.
 Ikọ ọsọñ - Full version: Ikọ ọsọñ, okpoho onuk.
 Akañkañ - Full version: Eñwan ọsọñ ekot ikpamfum, ọsọñ akaha ekot akañkañ.
 Ukemeke aka - Full version: Ukemeke aka, ka ise!.
 Oyom ñkpa - Full version: Oyom ñkpa otuk enañ isim.
 Ebibene - Full version: Ebibene ọsọñ, enañ eberi edem.
 Eto akan eto - The tree stronger than a tree.
 Ikpamfum - Full version: Eñwan ọsọñ ekot ikpamfum.
 Itiaba - The number seven which is regarded as a formidable number.
 Ofum ọsọñ - Lit. Strong wind.
 Isim ayara Ekpe - Lit. The tail of the male leopard.
 Ekikak - The industry.
 Otia etiti

Pet names
These names communicate the bearers personal attributes and natural abilities. Such names may describe attributes such as a person's talent at singing, enormous wealth, fashion sense and beauty. Examples include:

 Ñkoñ - Full version: Ñkoñ enem uyo nkan ekọmọ.
 Ntokon - Full version: Ntokon eye iso ndiọk edu.
 Ekpri abiabon - Full version: Ekpri abiabon ekim akwa ọfọñ.
 Ifọt itaha - Full version: Ifọt itaha eyen-eka ọsọñ mbañ.
 Ekebe - Full version: Ekebe okpo owo eye ke mbana.
 Efiom Efiom enyene ñkpọ - Full version: Efiom Efiom enyene ñkpö, owo efen inyeneke ñkpö nte Efiom enyenede.
 Inem ñkpọ - Full version: Inem ñkpö oduñ usuñ uyom.
 Ikọñ eye k'enyọñ - Full version: Iköñ eye k'enyöñ, esim isöñ akabade ndek.

Nicknames
These are names of endearment which may also communicate the circumstances of the bearer's birth or their position in the family. These names are never used in formal settings. Among these nicknames include:

 Adiaha-Akpan - This is given to the first daughter of a father who is the first son among his siblings.
 Akpakpan - This is given to the first son of a father who is also the first son among his siblings.
 Akpan-udọ - This is given to the first son of a father who is the second son among his siblings. 
 Adiaha-udọ - This is given to the first daughter of father who is the second son among his siblings.
 Akpan-adiaha - This is given to the first son of a mother who is the first daughter in among her siblings.
 Akpan-odunwan - This is given to the first son of a mother who is the second daughter.
 Koko-ete - This is given to a male child who bears the same name with the father.
 Koko-eka/Koko-mma - This is given to a female child who bears the same name with her mother.
 Koko-nne - This is given to a female child who bears her grandmother's name.

Other nicknames which reflect endearment and respect in the family include:
 Ufan-ete - Father's friend 
 Ufan-eka - Mother's friend
 Etinyịn - Our father (reserved for male children)
 Ekanyịn - Our mother (reserved for female children)
 Etete - Paternal grandfather
 Etema - Maternal grandfather
 Eka-ete - Paternal grandfather
 Eka-eka - Maternal grandmother
 Etebọñ - Father of a king (reserved from female children)
 Ekabọñ /Mmabọñ - Mother of a king (reserved for female children)
 Etekamba - Big father (reserved from female children)
 Mmakamba - Big mother - 
 Nne/Nne-nne/Ete-nne - Grandmother/Great grandmother/Grandmother's father usually given respectively to a son or daughter in memory of their grandparents.

There are also nicknames derived from the child's real name. Some of these include:
 Akpama or Eskọr from Asukwọ
 Ayib from Efiom
 Ebak from Otu
 Eddy from Edet
 Ika from Akabom
 Eka-Ekpo or Nkee from Nkese
 Eti from Etim
 Efi from Efiong
 Iyam from Eyamba
 Nkim from Effanga
 Nneneñ from Ekanem
 Odusu for Ekpenyong.

Double barrel names and numbers
When children were named after certain ancestors whom they are descended from, it was common to show the repetition of the name in the person's ancestry using a number or Double-barrelled name. A child who was the third person to answer the name Bassey in his family tree would be called, "Ita Bassey". ita is the efik translation of three. The number "Inang" may also be found in some names to depict that the child is the fourth person to answer a name. When the child is the second person to answer a name, the number "Iba" (two) is not used but rather, the structure of the name changes. Some examples include.

 Okokon - Given to a child who is the second in his ancestry to bear the name, Okon.
 Etetim - Given to a child who is the second in his ancestry to bear the name, Etim.
 Ededem - Given to a child who is the second in his ancestry to bear the name, Edem.
 Efefiom - Given to a child who is the second in his ancestry to bear the name, Efiom.
 Efefiong - Given to a child who is the second in his ancestry to bear the name, Efiong.
 Eyeyo - Given to a child who is the second in his ancestry to bear the name, Eyo.
 Ededet - Given to a child who is the second in his ancestry to bear the name, Edet.
 Essessien/Esesien - Given to a child who is the second in his ancestry to bear the name, Esien or Essien.

The primary name from which the new compound names are generated, is usually the name of the father of a child. For example, the information which reflects in the name of a child with the name Okokon Okon shows that the child is Okokon, the son of Okon. These compound names are not applicable to all Efik names but are only applicable to a few. In cases where such compound structure does not exist for a name, the name is simply repeated. For example, a child whose father's name is otu and who is the second in his ancestry to bear the name would be called Otu Otu. The same would be applicable to names such as Itam, Ekpenyong, Ukorebi which would be as follows:- Itam Itam, Ekpenyong Ekpenyong, Ukorebi Ukorebi.

Gender-Specific names
Most Efik names are unisex. However, it is common for names specific to men to be adapted for women as well. Efik names for men can often be adapted for women by introducing the suffix -Añwan. A father with the name Eyọ may choose to give his child the name Eyoañwan to show the strong bond between father and daughter. Other examples include

External influences

Anglicization of names
During the era of the triangular trade, a practice of taking up western styled names became common among the Efik. Certain Efik names were anglicised. Among these include:

Christian influence of Efik names
Although many Efik took up trading names during the era of the slave trade, they did not bear these trading names from birth. Many of such trading names were Christian names while some were of European origin. The bearing of western-styled names and christian names as personal birth names arose a number of years after the infiltration of Christianity in Efik society. On being baptised into the christian faith, many Efik assumed christian names. As a result, a number of typical name combinations can be found such as Elijah Henshaw, William Duke, Emmanuel Archibong. Similar cases can also be found among islamic-practicing Efik where names such as Suleiman, Adamu and Mohammed may be found.

References

Bibliography
 
 
 
  
 
 
 
  
 
 

Names by culture